Ákos Császár (26 February 1924, Budapest – 14 December 2017, Budapest) was a Hungarian mathematician, specializing in general topology and real analysis. He discovered the Császár polyhedron, a nonconvex polyhedron without diagonals. He introduced the notion of syntopogeneous spaces, a generalization of topological spaces.
 
During the end of 1944 his grandfather lost his life during the siege of Budapest. Then his father, older brother and himself were arrested by the Germans and sent to a concentration camp approximatively 45 miles east of Budapest. An infectious illness spread in the camp, and his brother and father died, but Ákos survived. He is a member of the group of five students of the late professor Lipót Fejér who called them "The Big Five". The other four are John Horvath, János Aczél, Steven Gaal and László Fuchs, all of whom are now retired mathematics professors in North America. Only Császár became a university professor in Budapest.

Between 1952 and 1992 he was head of the Department of Analysis at the Eötvös Loránd University, Budapest.
Corresponding member (1970), member (1979) of the Hungarian Academy of Sciences. He has been general secretary (1966–1980), president (1980–1990), honorary president (since 1990) of the János Bolyai Mathematical Society. He received the Kossuth Prize (1963) and the Gold Medal of the Hungarian Academy of Sciences (2009). Császár died on 14 December 2017, aged 93.

Selected publications
 Á. Császár: A polyhedron without diagonals, Acta Sci. Math. Szeged, 13(1949), 140–142.
 Á. Császár: Foundations of general topology, A Pergamon Press Book The Macmillan Co., New York  1963 xix+380 pp., translated from Fondements de la topology générale, Akadémiai Kiadó, Budapest (1960) 231 pp.
 Á. Császár: General topology, Translated from the Hungarian by Klára Császár. Adam Hilger Ltd., Bristol,  1978. 488 pp.

References

1924 births
2017 deaths
Topologists
20th-century Hungarian mathematicians
21st-century Hungarian mathematicians
Members of the Hungarian Academy of Sciences
Scientists from Budapest